Diana Perryman MBE (9 November 1925 - 10 January 1979) was an Australian actress., who appeared in stage, film and television. She was posthumously awarded the MBE in 1979. 
 
She was the sister of stage and screen actress and singer Jill Perryman.

Select credits
Corinth House (1961)
The Big Client (1961)
I Have Been Here Before (1964)
The Purple Jacaranda (1964)

References

External links
Diana Perryman at IMDb
Diana Perryman at Ausstage

20th-century Australian actresses
1925 births
1979 deaths
Australian stage actresses
Australian film actresses
Australian television actresses